Linda Baboolal (January 31, 1941 – September 12, 2019) was a Trinidad and Tobago politician and physician. She served as the Minister of Social Services and Minister of Health, the first female chairperson of the People's National Movement (PNM), and as President of the Senate of Trinidad and Tobago (2002–2007).

Early life and education
Linda Mohan was born in Siparia, Trinidad to parents Solomon and Sylvia Mohan. She was the eldest child of six — five girls and one boy.

Career
Her childhood dream was to become a medical doctor - which she accomplished along with her husband, Michael Baboolal, in Dublin, Ireland. She interned at the Port of Spain General Hospital.

After their children were grown, she was approached by a new political party, National Alliance for Reconstruction (NAR), to be one of their candidates for election to government. She considered this at the time, but due to time constraints she declined.

She was actively involved in many charitable organizations - especially with the drug addiction rehabilitation center at Mount St. Benedict - which was the first of its kind in the country.

In 1991, she was again approached by the PNM to be a candidate in the general election and this time she accepted. She was the representative for the San Juan/Barataria constituency. She was appointed Minister of Social Services and then Minister of Health. At the following election, she lost her seat to the opposition but was then made the first female chairperson of the PNM.

She did not run for the next election but was still active in the party. She was nominated as President of the Senate - during which she acted as President of Trinidad and Tobago on numerous occasions.

Marriage and children
She was married to Michael Baboolal.

References

1941 births
2019 deaths
Presidents of the Senate (Trinidad and Tobago)
Government ministers of Trinidad and Tobago
People's National Movement politicians
Women government ministers of Trinidad and Tobago
Trinidad and Tobago people of Indian descent
Members of the House of Representatives (Trinidad and Tobago)
21st-century Trinidad and Tobago women politicians
21st-century Trinidad and Tobago politicians
20th-century Trinidad and Tobago women politicians
20th-century Trinidad and Tobago politicians